General Edward James Lawder (1821 - 2 March 1900) was a British Army officer in British India.

Military career
Lawder was born in 1821, and entered the army in 1839. He served in India during the Indian Rebellion of 1857, as acting quartermaster-general with the Field Force established to relieve Saugor, taking part in the skirmish at Kubrai, the battle of Banda, the relief of Kirwee, and the storming of the heights of Punwarree. For his services he was mentioned in despatches and received the brevet rank of major. He transferred to the Madras Staff Corps, and received the brevet rank of colonel in 1871. He was promoted to major-general in 1881, and was placed on the unemployed supernumerary list in 1886. He was subsequently promoted to lieutenant-general in 1887, and received the rank of general on 1 March 1891.

General Lawder died at 36, Campden-hill-gardens, on 2 March 1900.

Family
He was married to Dora Jane, who died in Kensington on 27 May 1877. They had children, including:
 James Ormsby Lawder, High Sheriff of Leitrim 1909
 Edward John Lawder, who married in Chuddeghat, Hyderabad on 28 November 1885 Madge Ellis, fifth daughter of George Ellis, of the Madras civil service
 Arthur Henry Lawder, who married in Oaklake, Manitoba on 1 December 1892 Blanche Adeline Luff, second daughter of John W. Luff, of Old House, Blandford
 Dora Ellen Lawder, who married in 1874 Francis G. Bertram, of Beaulieu, Jersey, Lieutenant of the 86th (Royal County Down) Regiment of Foot

Arms

References

1821 births
1900 deaths
British Army generals